Mathieua is a genus of South American plants in the family Amaryllidaceae. It contains only one known species, Mathieua galanthoides, native to Peru but reportedly extinct.

References

Amaryllidoideae
Endemic flora of Peru
Monotypic Amaryllidaceae genera
Extinct plants